This is a list of the National Register of Historic Places listings in Kaufman County, Texas.

This is intended to be a complete list of properties listed on the National Register of Historic Places in Kaufman County, Texas. There are eight properties listed on the National Register in the county. Four properties are Recorded Texas Historic Landmarks including one that is also a State Antiquities Landmark.

Current listings

The locations of National Register properties may be seen in a mapping service provided.

|}

See also

National Register of Historic Places listings in Texas
Recorded Texas Historic Landmarks in Kaufman County

References

External links

Registered Historic Places
Kaufman County
Buildings and structures in Kaufman County, Texas